Daniel Eon (20 December 1939 – 15 March 2021) was a French footballer who represented the France national team. He played most of his career with FC Nantes.

References

External links
 

1939 births
2021 deaths
Sportspeople from Saint-Nazaire
French footballers
Association football goalkeepers
France international footballers
FC Nantes players
Ligue 1 players
Ligue 2 players
Footballers from Loire-Atlantique